The Champion is a 1973 Martial Arts Hong Kong film directed by Chu-got Ching-wan and Yang Ching-chen.

Film title 
In the United States, the film is released as Shanghai Lil and the Sun Luck Kid. The film's other alias include Karate King, or Chivalrous Guest.

Plot 
Lu Fu (Chin Han) spent a few years in prison for a crime he didn't commit. Upon getting out, Lu Fu returns to his coal-mining hometown to discover Lu Te-Piao (Lung Fei), his brother, has taken over the town and imprisoned their sister, Ah Chu (Shih Szu).

Cast
 Chin Han - Lu Fu
 Shih Szu - Ah Chu
 Yi Yuan - Yung Tien (Nagata)
 Lung Fei - Lu Te-piao
 Han Su - Undertaker Hsu
 Chin Tu - Chuan Fu
 Lau Kwan - Ta Kuei-tzu
 Shih Chung-Tien - Karateka Katsumasa

See also
 List of Shaw Brothers films
 Hong Kong films of 1973

References

External links
 douban.com
 IMDb entry
 HK cinemagic entry

1973 films
Hong Kong martial arts films
Second Sino-Japanese War films
1970s Hong Kong films